This is a list of the gymnasts who represented their country at the 1976 Summer Olympics in Montreal from 17 July to 1 August 1976. Only one discipline, artistic gymnastics, was included in the Games.

Female artistic gymnasts

Male artistic gymnasts

References 

Lists of gymnasts
Gymnastics at the 1976 Summer Olympics